Ex parte Milligan, 71 U.S. (4 Wall.) 2 (1866), is a landmark decision of the U.S. Supreme Court that ruled that the use of military tribunals to try civilians when civil courts are operating is unconstitutional. In this particular case, the Court was unwilling to give President Abraham Lincoln's administration the power of military commission jurisdiction, part of the administration's controversial plan to deal with Union dissenters during the American Civil War. Justice David Davis, who delivered the majority opinion, stated that "martial rule can never exist when the courts are open" and confined martial law to areas of "military operations, where war really prevails", and when it was a necessity to provide a substitute for a civil authority that had been overthrown. Chief Justice Salmon P. Chase and three associate justices filed a separate opinion concurring with the majority in the judgment, but asserting that Congress had the power to authorize a military commission, although it had not done so in Milligan's case.

The case stemmed from a trial by a military commission of Lambdin P. Milligan, Stephen Horsey, William A. Bowles, and Andrew Humphreys that convened at Indianapolis on October 21, 1864. The charges against the men included, among others, conspiracy against the U.S. government, offering aid and comfort to the Confederates, and inciting rebellion. On December 10, 1864, Milligan, Bowles, and Horsey were found guilty on all charges and sentenced to hang. Humphreys was found guilty and sentenced to hard labor for the remainder of the war. (The sentence for Humphreys was later modified, allowing his release; President Andrew Johnson commuted the sentences for Milligan, Bowles, and Horsey to life imprisonment.) On May 10, 1865, Milligan's legal counsel filed a petition in the Circuit Court of the United States for the District of Indiana at Indianapolis for a writ of habeas corpus, which called for a justification of Milligan's arrest. A similar petition was filed on behalf of Bowles and Horsey. The two judges who reviewed Milligan's petition disagreed about the issue of whether the U.S. Constitution prohibited civilians from being tried by a military commission and passed the case to the U.S. Supreme Court. The case was argued before the Court on March 5 and March 13, 1866; the decision was handed down on April 3, 1866.

Background

Suppression of dissenters
During the American Civil War, the administration of President Abraham Lincoln dealt with Union dissenters by declaring martial law; sanctioning arbitrary arrest and detention; suspending the writ of habeas corpus, which requires justification of any detention; and initiating trials by military commission rather than in conventional civil courts. The rationale for these actions was that Article 1, Section 9 of the U.S. Constitution authorizes the suspension of the writ of habeas corpus "when in Cases of Rebellion or Invasion the public Safety may require it". Lincoln theorized that the civil courts in the United States were established to try individuals and small groups "on charges of crimes well defined in the law" and not to deal with large groups of dissenters, whose actions, though damaging to the war effort, did not constitute a "defined crime" in states loyal to the government. Lincoln believed his administration's plan would suppress anti-government agitators, but he was also optimistic that it would be rescinded after the war ended.

The first test of Lincoln's thesis for silencing dissenters occurred in the spring of 1863. Clement Vallandigham, an Ohio politician and antiwar Democrat, was placed under arrest on May 5, 1863, taken to Cincinnati for a trial before a military commission, and jailed. Vallandigham was found guilty and sentenced to prison for the remainder of the war, but Lincoln commuted the sentence and ordered him exiled to the Confederacy. Vallandigham's petition to the U.S. Supreme Court, known as Ex parte Vallandigham, was denied.

Trial by military commission
The next test began with trials by a military commission that led to the U.S. Supreme Court case of Ex parte Milligan. On September 17, 1864, General Alvin Peterson Hovey, commander of the Military District of Indiana, authorized a military commission to meet on September 19 at Indianapolis, Indiana, to begin trials of Harrison H. Dodd, "grand commander" of the Sons of Liberty in Indiana, and others placed under military arrest. These prisoners included Democrats Lambdin P. Milligan, a lawyer living in Huntington, Indiana, and an outspoken critic of President Lincoln and Indiana's Republican governor Oliver P. Morton; Joseph J. Bingham, editor of the Indianapolis Daily Sentinel and chairman of Indiana's Democratic State Central Committee; William A. Bowles of French Lick, Indiana; William M. Harrison, secretary of the Democratic Club of Marion County, Indiana; Horace Heffren, editor of the Washington (Indiana) Democrat; Stephen Horsey of Martin County, Indiana; and Andrew Humphreys of Bloomfield, Indiana. Two other men, James B. Wilson and David T. Yeakel, were also seized. Dodd, who was the first to be tried, escaped from jail before his trial was completed and fled to Canada. On October 10, 1864, he was found guilty, convicted in absentia, and sentenced to hang. Charges against Bingham, Harrison, Yeakel, and Wilson were dismissed. Heffren was released before the proceedings against Milligan began.

The military commission for the trial of Milligan, Horsey, Bowles, and Humphreys convened in Indianapolis on October 21, 1864. The commission considered five charges against the men: conspiracy against the U.S. government, offering aid and comfort to the Confederates, inciting insurrections, "disloyal practices", and "violation of the laws of war". The defendants were alleged to have established a secret organization that planned to liberate Confederate soldiers from Union prisoner-of-war camps in Illinois, Indiana, and Ohio,  and then seize an arsenal, provide the freed prisoners with arms, raise an armed force to incite a general insurrection, and join with the Confederates to invade Indiana, Illinois, and Kentucky and make war on the government of the United States.

The military commission's decision on December 10, 1864, found Milligan, Bowles, and Horsey guilty. The men were sentenced to be hanged on May 19, 1865. Humphreys was found guilty and sentenced to hard labor for the remainder of the war. With President Lincoln's support, General Hovey modified the sentence for Humphreys, allowing his release, but Humphreys was required to remain within two specific townships in Greene County, Indiana, and could not participate in any acts that opposed the war. Efforts were made to secure pardons for Milligan, Bowles, and Horsey, with the decision passing to President Johnson following Lincoln's assassination.

Circuit Court petition
On May 10, 1865, Jonathan W. Gorden, Milligan's legal counsel, filed a petition for a writ of habeas corpus in the Circuit Court of the United States for the District of Indiana in Indianapolis. A similar petition was filed on behalf of Bowles and Horsey. The petitions were based on an act of the Congress titled "An Act Relating to Habeas Corpus and Regulation Judicial Proceedings in Certain Cases" that went into effect on March 3, 1863. The act was intended to resolve the question of whether Lincoln had the constitutional authority to suspend the writ of habeas corpus as authorized under Article 1 of the U.S. Constitution. Milligan's petition alleged that a federal grand jury had met in Indianapolis during January 1865, which it did, and it had not indicted him, which is also true, making him eligible for a release from prison under the congressional act.

On May 16, three days before their scheduled execution, Horsey's sentence was commuted to life imprisonment and the executions of Milligan and Bowles were postponed to June 2. President Johnson approved commutation of the sentences for Milligan and Bowles to life imprisonment on May 30, 1865. In the interim, Justice David Davis, an associate justice of the U.S. Supreme Court and a judge of the federal circuit that included Indiana, and Judge Thomas Drummond, another federal circuit court judge, reviewed Milligan's circuit court petition. The two judges disagreed about whether the U.S. Constitution prohibited civilians from being tried by a military commission and passed the case to the U.S. Supreme Court.

Arguments

The U.S. Supreme Court was asked to consider three questions in the Ex parte Milligan case: 
Should a writ of habeas corpus be issued based on Milligan's petition? 
Should Milligan be discharged from custody? 
Did the military commission have jurisdiction to try and sentence Milligan? 
The Court did not consider the charges or the evidence presented in the trial by the military commission. The only issues it considered were whether the military commission's proceedings were constitutional, and whether Milligan was entitled to a discharge.

The case was argued before the Court on March 5 and March 13, 1866. The team representing the United States was U.S. Attorney General James Speed, Henry Stanbery, and Benjamin F. Butler, a Civil War general who later became a congressman and governor of Massachusetts. General Butler delivered the argument for the United States. Among the members of Milligan's legal team were Joseph E. McDonald; David Dudley Field, who was a New York lawyer and brother of U.S. Supreme Court justice Stephen Johnson Field; James A. Garfield, a member of Congress in his first ever courtroom argument and a future U.S. president; and Jeremiah S. Black, who had been former President James Buchanan's U.S. Attorney General and U.S. Secretary of State.

Decision

On April 3, 1866, Chief Justice Salmon P. Chase handed down the Court's decision, which decreed that the writ of habeas corpus could be issued based on the congressional act of March 3, 1863; the military commission did not have the jurisdiction to try and sentence Milligan; and he was entitled to a discharge. Milligan, Bowles, and Horsey were discharged from prison on April 12, 1866. The Court's opinion was read during the next Court session.

On December 17, 1866, Justice Davis delivered the majority opinion explaining that Milligan, who was a civilian not in military service and resident of a state in which civilian courts were still functioning, had a right, when charged with a crime, to be tried and punished according to the law. Under the U.S. Constitution this included security against unreasonable search and seizure, a warrant for probable cause before arrest, and if indicted, a speedy trial by jury. Justice Davis disagreed with the federal government's argument regarding the propriety of the military commission, stating that "martial rule can never exist when the courts are open" and confined martial law to areas of "military operations, where war really prevails," and when it became a necessity to provide a substitute for a civil authority that had been overthrown. This was not the situation in Indiana, where the civilian courts were still operating at the time of Milligan's arrest, trial, and incarceration. The majority opinion further observed that during the suspension of the writ of habeas corpus, citizens may only be detained without charges, not "tried" or executed under the jurisdictions of military tribunals. The writ is not the right itself, but merely the ability to issue orders demanding the right's "enforcement."

In Ex parte Milligan, which was a case about governmental power and personal liberty, the Court's decision stood "on the side of personal liberty." In the case, the Court was unwilling to give President Lincoln's administration the power of military commission jurisdiction. The Court's decision avoided the risk of its abuse by future administrations in other situations. It is also important to note the political environment of the decision. Under a Republican Congress immediately after the Civil War, the Court was reluctant to hand down any decision that questioned the legitimacy of military courts, especially in the occupied South. The president's ability to suspend the writ of habeas corpus without congressional approval was not addressed in this case, most likely because it was a moot issue with respect to the case at hand.  President Lincoln had suspended the writ nationwide on September 24, 1862, and Congress had ratified this action on March 3, 1863, with the Habeas Corpus Suspension Act.  Milligan was detained in October 1864, more than a year after Congress formally suspended the writ.

Chief Justice Chase noted that, in the South, "courts might be open and undisturbed in the execution of their functions, and yet wholly incompetent to avert threatened danger, or to punish, with adequate promptitude and certainty, the guilty conspirators." In other words, state courts in the former Confederacy would not protect the former slaves from violence.

Three types of military jurisdiction
This case was also important in clarifying the scope of military jurisdiction under the U.S. Constitution. The Supreme Court held:
There are under the Constitution three kinds of military jurisdiction: one to be exercised both in peace and war, another to be exercised in time of foreign war without the boundaries of the United States, or in time of rebellion and civil war within states or districts occupied by rebels treated [71 U.S. 2, 142] as belligerents, and a third to be exercised in time of invasion or insurrection within the limits of the United States or during rebellion within the limits of states maintaining adhesion to the National Government, when the public danger requires its exercise. The first of these may be called jurisdiction under MILITARY LAW, and is found in acts of Congress prescribing rules and articles of war, or otherwise providing for the government of the national forces; the second may be distinguished as MILITARY GOVERNMENT, superseding, as far as may be deemed expedient, the local law and exercised by the military commander under the direction of the President, with the express or implied sanction of Congress, while the third may be denominated MARTIAL LAW PROPER, and is called into action by Congress, or temporarily, when the action of Congress cannot be invited, and, in the case of justifying or excusing peril, by the President, in times of insurrection or invasion or of civil or foreign war, within districts or localities where ordinary law no longer adequately secures public safety and private rights.

This distinction between martial law and military government was not commonly made before 1866. However, after the Supreme Court's clarification in this landmark case, it has continued to be referenced. Birkhimer describes the difference on page 1 of his opus Military Government and Martial Law (3rd edition, 1914): "Military jurisdiction is treated in the following pages in its two branches of Military Government and Martial Law. The former is exercised over enemy territory; the latter over loyal territory of the State enforcing it." According to the U.S. Army Field Manual FM 27-10, The Law of Land Warfare, paragraph 362: "Military government is the form of administration by which an occupying power exercises governmental authority over occupied territory. The necessity for such government arises from the failure or inability of the legitimate government to exercise its functions on account of the military occupation, or the undesirability of allowing it to do so."

Concurrence 
Justices David Davis and four others (Nathan Clifford, Stephen Johnson Field, Robert Cooper Grier, and Samuel Nelson) signed the majority opinion. Chief Justice Salmon P. Chase and Justices James Moore Wayne, Noah Haynes Swayne, and Samuel Freeman Miller filed a separate opinion concurring with the majority in the judgment, but they disagreed with the majority's assertion that Congress did not have the power to authorize military commissions in Indiana. Chief Justice Chase asserted that Congress had the power to authorize a military commission, but it had not done so in Milligan's case. The separate opinion also stated that Congress could "authorize trials for crimes against the security and safety of the national forces," and its authority to do so "may be derived from its constitutional power to raise and support armies and to declare war;" while the civil courts "might be open and undisturbed in their functions, and yet wholly incompetent to avert threatened danger, or to punish, with adequate promptitude and certainty, the guilty conspirators." However, as Justice Davis described the status of the federal courts in Indiana at the time, "It needed no bayonets to protect it, and required no military aid to execute its judgments."

Aftermath
Ex parte Milligan became well known as the leading U.S. Supreme Court case that found the president exceeded his legal powers to suppress dissenters during the American Civil War. The decision also helped establish the tradition that presidential and military action based on war had limits.

After Milligan's release from prison, he returned to his home and law practice in Huntington, Indiana. In 1868 he filed a civil lawsuit in Huntington County, Indiana, seeking damages related to Ex parte Milligan. Milligan's civil case was referred to the U.S. Circuit Court for Indiana at Indianapolis. Milligan v. Hovey, a two-week jury trial held in May 1871, named as defendants several men involved in Milligan's treason trial, including Alvin P. Hovey and Oliver P. Morton. Milligan hired Thomas A. Hendricks as his legal counsel. The defendants hired Benjamin Harrison, later the 23rd president. Milligan's civil suit was "the first major civil rights jury trial held before the federal courts." At issue was what damages, if any, Milligan had sustained relating to Ex parte Milligan. Harrison portrayed Milligan as a traitor, while Hendricks focused on the "malicious prosecution and false imprisonment" of Milligan At the civil trial, Milligan refused to admit his affiliation or actions with a seditious organization. The jury issued its verdict in Milligan's favor on May 30, 1871. Although Milligan sought thousands of dollars in damages, state and federal statutes limited the claim to five dollars plus court costs.

See also
Ex parte Merryman (C.C.D. Md. 1861) 
Ex parte Quirin (1942)
Hamdi v. Rumsfeld (2004)
List of United States Supreme Court cases, volume 71
Martial law
Supreme Court cases of the American Civil War

Notes

References
  
  
 
  
 
 "The Law of Land Warfare." In  (Subscription needed) (This manual supersedes FM 27-10, 1 October 1940, including C 1, 15 November 1944. Changes required on 15 July 1976, have been incorporated within this document.)
 Nolan, Alan T., "Ex Parte Milligan: A Curb of Executive and Military Power." In

Further reading
 Coleman, Elisheva Ruth (2005). "Call It Peace or Call It Treason: The Milligan Case and the Meaning of Loyalty in the Civil War." (senior thesis) Princeton, NJ: Princeton University
 Neely, Jr., Mark. E. (1991). The Fate of Liberty: Abraham Lincoln and Civil Liberties. New York: Oxford University Press.
 
 
 
 Winger, Stewart L., and White, Jonathan W., eds. (2020). Ex Parte Milligan Reconsidered: Race and Civil Liberties From the Lincoln Administration to the War on Terror. Lawrence, Kansas: University of Kansas Press.

External links

 

1866 in United States case law
United States Supreme Court cases of the Chase Court
Criminal cases in the Chase Court
United States habeas corpus case law
United States Fourth Amendment case law
Grand Jury Clause case law
United States Sixth Amendment jury case law
Federal court cases involving Indiana
Indiana in the American Civil War
American Civil War prison camps
Reconstruction Era
United States Supreme Court cases
Treason in the United States